Union Township is one of the sixteen townships of Scioto County, Ohio, United States.  The 2010 census counted 2,241 people in the township.

Geography
Located in the western part of the county, it borders the following townships:
Morgan Township - north
Rush Township - northeast
Washington Township - southeast
Nile Township - south
Brush Creek Township - west

No municipalities are located in Union Township.

Name and history
It is one of twenty-seven Union Townships statewide.

Union Township was organized on August 9, 1803. It was named for the federal union.

In 1833, Union Township contained one forge and finery for making iron, three gristmills and four saw mills, one store, and one tannery.

Government
The township is governed by a three-member board of trustees, who are elected in November of odd-numbered years to a four-year term beginning on the following January 1. Two are elected in the year after the presidential election and one is elected in the year before it. There is also an elected township fiscal officer, who serves a four-year term beginning on April 1 of the year after the election, which is held in November of the year before the presidential election. Vacancies in the fiscal officership or on the board of trustees are filled by the remaining trustees.

References

External links
County website

Townships in Scioto County, Ohio
Townships in Ohio